, also known as , is a fictional character from Capcom's video game Ōkami. She is a white wolf based on the Japanese goddess, in Japanese mythology. Amaterasu also appears in the Marvel vs. Capcom series. Since debuting in Ōkami, Amaterasu has garnered mostly positive reception from both video game publications and fans, often included among the top Capcom characters, best canine characters in games, and one of the best video game protagonists overall.

Appearances

Ōkami
According to the character's backstory, Amaterasu originally existed in the Celestial Plains, ruling over the Celestials and the mortal world as a protector deity. Alongside Waka, she battled Orochi, the eight-headed serpent who attacked and wreaked havoc upon the Celestial Plain. Waka told Amaterasu that Orochi could only be defeated by the Chosen One, a human named Nagi. Hearing this, she dragged Orochi down to the human world to wait for Nagi's birth. Meanwhile, Waka and the remaining Celestials fled into the Ark of Yamato, where all except Waka perished to an ambush of demons led by Yami, the Emperor of Eternal Darkness.

With each passing year, Orochi dined on another maiden from Kamiki Village on the annual festival. Before every festival, Amaterasu appeared around the village in the form of a white wolf. The villagers assumed her to be Orochi's familiar, naming her Shiranui. Eventually, Nagi fought Orochi, and through his combined efforts with Shiranui, he was able to seal Orochi away. Shiranui, however, died from both poisoned wounds inflicted during the battle and protecting Nagi from a falling rock. Taken back to the village, she was hailed as a hero, and a statue was built in her honor. After her death, her Celestial Brush powers had scattered, leaving her drastically weakened, with only her original ability, Sunrise. Furthermore, the peoples' faith in the gods had dwindled, leaving her even weaker.

The main story of the Ōkami begins one hundred years after Shiranui's death. When Nagi's descendant, Susano, removes the sword Tsukuyomi that had sealed Orochi away, Orochi wastes no time in taking over Nippon (Japan) once again. Sakuya, the wood sprite, revived Amaterasu within the statue of Shiranui, giving her the Reflector Divine Retribution. Together with Issun, a loudmouth Poncle found within Sakuya's robe, Amaterasu sets off to revive the Guardian Saplings scattered across Nippon and restore the lands to their original beauty and rid them from evil's hold.

Throughout her journey, Amaterasu is reunited with many of her powers, and regains people's faith in the form of Praise. Eventually, Amaterasu, with the help of Susano, manages to destroy Orochi. She then continues her journey through Nippon, regaining more of her brush techniques, and further restoring people's faith and the lands. Finally, she finds herself in Kamui at the Ark of Yamato. Boarding it with Waka, she finds herself fighting previously defeated demons, including Orochi. Having vanquished them all once again, she finally faces off against Yami. During the battle, Yami manages to strip Amaterasu of all of her powers, but she gradually regains her techniques back, until Yami destroys the Celestial Gods themselves, which destroys her powers, leaving her severely weakened and hovering towards death. With the aid of Issun, who takes up his role as the Celestial Envoy, and all the people she met, who send her praise and prayers, her power is fully restored and she is able to vanquish the evil demon once and for all. She and Waka then return to the Celestial Plain to restore it, and finally bring peace and harmony back to the world.

Other video games
Outside of Ōkami, Amaterasu appears as a playable character in the fighting game Marvel vs. Capcom 3: Fate of Two Worlds and its update Ultimate Marvel vs. Capcom 3.

A Palico costume for Capcom's Monster Hunter Generations based on Amaterasu was offered as part of the game's downloadable content. Similarly, a Palamute costume based on Amaterasu was added to Monster Hunter Rise as part of a crossover event in July 2021.

To coincide with the PC release of Ōkami HD, Capcom created and got approval for an Amaterasu "courier" for Valve's Dota 2, given free to those who had pre-ordered Ōkami HD on Steam.

In 2020, Amaterasu appeared as a playable hero in Teppen.

Other media
Amaterasu also appears in Archie Comics' Worlds Unite crossover between its Mega Man and Sonic the Hedgehog titles, where she is one of many Capcom and Sega heroes recruited by Wood Man and Princess Sally Acorn to battle Sigma.

Creation and design
Ōkami was originally planned to be rendered in a more photorealistic 3D style, but Clover Studio determined that the more colorful sumi-e style allowed them to better convey Amaterasu's association with nature and the task of restoring it. Amaterasu's initial designs were aimed to avoid having the character look like "your pet wearing clothing". The developers had considered having Amaterasu change into a dolphin when in the water and a falcon when jumping off a cliff, but dropped these ideas.

Reception
The character was very well received by fans and critics alike. IGN's Cam Shea said Amaterasu "has a delightful duality. At once a powerful goddess, capable of making sweeping changes to the world, she's also in turn a wolf pup, digging into the earth in search of treasure". Opposing her to the game cliché of "The Animal with Attitude", GamesRadar said she "doesn't need 'attitude'. She has majesty, wisdom and grace instead". In 2010, readers of the Japanese magazine Famitsu voted Amaterasu into eighth place in a poll for the best video game character of all time. In the same year, in a Dengeki poll, she was voted fourth as a character readers wanted to befriend.  In 2012, GamesRadar ranked her as the 49th "most memorable, influential, and badass" protagonist in games.

Amaterasu ranked as the fifth best PlayStation dog according to PlayStation Official Magazine in 2012, as "rarely has a dog been as beautiful as the glorious work of art"; a similar list by Joystick Division in 2011 declared her "the most brilliant canine protagonist of any video game"; the same happened in UGO Networks' "Top 10 Video Game Dogs". Complex placed Amaterasu and Issun at 21st spot on a list of "most a**-kicking" game duos in 2012, and included Amaterasu alone in its 2013 lists of "most badass" video game characters of all time (ranked 32nd), greatest heroines in video game history (ranked 17th), and top canines in video games (ranked third). Patrick Lindsey of Paste ranked her as the second best video game wolf in 2014.

GameDaily listed her as the 15th top Capcom character of all time. She appeared on IGN list of characters they wanted in a possible Marvel vs. Capcom 3, where they commented Amaterasu "would add a nice dash of variety in addition to visual spectacle", adding she "is unique and violent enough to warrant more attention than is currently given". Her inclusion in Marvel vs. Capcom 3 were received positively both for fans and critics. Including her among the 30 best characters in the three decades of Capcom's history, GamesRadar staff noted that "Okami launched to lower than expected sales, but that didn’t stop the game and its protagonist from gaining a very dedicated following".

Notes

References

Further reading

Action-adventure game characters
Animal characters in video games
Capcom protagonists
Deity characters in video games
Female characters in video games
Fictional artists in video games
Fictional characters who can manipulate light
Fictional characters who can manipulate reality
Fictional characters who can manipulate time
Fictional characters with plant abilities
Fictional characters with superhuman durability or invulnerability
Fictional female martial artists
Fictional female swordfighters
Fictional goddesses
Fictional martial artists in video games
Fictional painters
Fictional swordfighters in video games
Fictional wolves
Ōkami
Silent protagonists
Video game characters introduced in 2006
Video game characters who can move at superhuman speeds
Video game characters who use magic
Video game characters with air or wind abilities
Video game characters with electric or magnetic abilities
Video game characters with fire or heat abilities
Video game characters with ice or cold abilities
Video game characters with superhuman strength
Video game characters with water abilities
Video game mascots
Woman soldier and warrior characters in video games